This is a list of named geological features on Saturn's moon Titan. Official names for these features have only been announced since the 2000s, as Titan's surface was virtually unknown before the arrival of the Cassini–Huygens probe. Some features were known by informal nicknames beforehand; these names are noted where appropriate. Note that some features with a physical size given by "diameter" may not be circular; then the number refers to the length.

Albedo features

Albedo features on Titan are named after sacred or enchanted places in world mythologies and literature.

Bright albedo features

Dark albedo features

Arcūs
Titanean arcūs (arc-shaped features) are named after deities of happiness.

Colles
Colles are small hills or knobs which are named after characters in J. R. R. Tolkien's Middle-earth.

Craters
Craters on Titan are named after deities of wisdom.

Faculae
Faculae (bright spots) are named after islands on Earth that are not politically independent. Groups of faculae are named after archipelagos on Earth.

Fluctūs
The term "fluctus" refers to flow terrain. Fluctūs on Titan are named after mythological figures associated with beauty.

Flumina
A flumen is a feature that looks like a channel carved by liquid. Flumina refers to a network of rivers. Some flumina are not found near liquid bodies, which are labelled as "dry valley". They are named after mythical or imaginary rivers.

Freta
A fretum (plural freta) is a strait of liquid connecting two larger liquid bodies. They are named after characters from the Foundation series of science fiction novels by Isaac Asimov.

Insulae
Insulae are islands within Titan's seas. They are named after legendary islands.

Labyrinthi
Labyrinthi (complexes of intersecting valleys or ridges) on Titan are named after planets from the fictional Dune universe created by Frank Herbert.

Lacunae

Lacunae are dark areas with the appearance of dry lake beds, which are named after intermittent lakes on Earth.

Lacūs

Lacūs (plural form of lacus used in Titan geological nomenclature) are hydrocarbon lakes.

Large ringed features
Large ring features are named after deities of wisdom in world mythology.

Maculae

Titanean maculae (dark spots) are named after deities of happiness, peace, and harmony in world mythology.

Maria

Maria (plural of mare) are hydrocarbon seas.

Montes
Mountains are named after mountains from the fictional Middle-Earth created by J.R.R. Tolkien.

Paterae
Paterae are caldera or deep-wall craters with a possible volcanic origin. Sotra Patera was formerly named Sotra Facula, which followed the naming theme for Faculae. No nomenclature currently exists for this class of features on Titan.

Planitiae
Planitiae (low plains) on Titan are named after planets from the fictional Dune universe created by Frank Herbert.

Regiones

Regiones (regions distinctly different from their surroundings) are named after deities of peace and happiness.

Sinūs
Sinus (bays) within seas or lakes are named after terrestrial bays, coves, fjords or inlets.

Terrae
Terrae are extensive landmasses. As with the albedo features, they are named after sacred and enchanted locations from cultures across the world.

Undae
Undae are dune fields. On Titan they are named after Greek deities of wind.

Virgae

Virgae (streaks of colour) are named after rain gods in world mythologies.

Informal names for previously unnamed features

Because the exact nature of many surface features remain mysterious, a number of features took time to receive formal names and are known by nicknames. In most cases, indications of brightness and darkness refer not to visible light, but to the infrared images used to look through Titan's obscuring haze.

'The Sickle': a large, dark, sickle-shaped region identified by the Hubble Space Telescope.
'Throat of Kraken': unofficial name for the strait that separates the north and south basins of Kraken Mare, before officially being named Seldon Fretum. It was used in early publications that hypothesized about its role with tidal dissipation and surface currents between the two basins of Kraken Mare.

See also
Lakes of Titan

Notes

References

External links
USGS: Titan nomenclature
USGS links to PDF maps with nomenclature

Titan
Titan, geological features